The daxophone, invented by Hans Reichel, is an electric wooden experimental musical instrument of the friction idiophones category.

Etymology 
The dax in daxophone is derived from the German word Dachs, meaning "badger" and referencing the many animal sounds that the daxophone is capable of generating, changed to dax so that the instrument name echoes Adolphe Sax's saxophone.

History 
The first usage of the daxophone in a musical work was the release of Hans Reichel's  album The Dawn of Dachsman in 1987. Even with Hans Reichel's second album featuring the daxophone, Shanghaied on Tor Road: The World's 1st Operetta Performed on Nothing but the Daxophone, the instrument had remained very obscure. It was not until after his release of Yuxo: A New Daxophone Operetta that the daxophone began to gain notability through the internet, spawning YouTube videos and inspiring other artists such as Michael Hearst to create their own albums featuring the daxophone. Even today, the daxophone remains fairly obscure, and as such it has not been mass-produced, requiring any aspiring daxophonists to build their own. Luthier Yuri Landman has designed a simple-to-build daxophone for DIY workshops he regularly gives throughout Europe on academies, art spaces and festivals where participants build their own rudimentary version.

Construction 
The daxophone consists of a wooden piece called a tongue, approximately 330 mm in length, 30 mm in width, and 5 mm in height, and fixed to a wooden block (often attached to a tripod, but also clamped to a table top), which holds one or more contact microphones. This wooden block has a cavity which is carved with a chisel for the insertion of two contact microphones, and a snakewood soundboard laid on top with the contact microphones glued to it. A wide range of voice-like timbres can be produced, depending on the shape of the tongue and the type of wood. The tongue shape is made with a bandsaw or jigsaw. Denser woods such as ebony and oak produce a mellower sound than light woods. These sounds are notable for their comical, often human sounds.

Another vital part is the dax, sanded into a curved shape approximately 150 mm long and 50 mm tall, with a custom width tailored to the player's hands, and curved on both sides to allow for frictionless pitch changing. One side of the dax is fretted according to a random logarithmic succession, while the other is left unfretted and covered with a sheet of cardboard for a mellower sound and to preserve the surface. Two large fingerholes are drilled through the sides.

Reichel has documented the construction of the instrument in a way that a skilled woodworker could build their own. Plans are downloadable from his website, with a collection of proven shapes for the tongue delivered in the file format of a font, thus playing on Reichel's other profession as a typeface designer.

Usage 

Normally, the daxophone is played by bowing the free end with a bow, most commonly a double bass bow, but it can also be struck or plucked, which propagates sound in the same way a ruler halfway off a table does. Vibrations then continue to the wooden-block base, which in turn is amplified by the contact microphone(s) therein. The timbre is adjusted by where it is bowed, and where along its length it is stopped with the dax. One side of the dax is fretted according to a randomly chosen logarithmic succession. The frequency interval between each fret in the succession will change due to the difference in pitch range between tongues, which is why the unfretted side is more frequently used for playing tonally in known compositions.

List of known daxophonists and discography 
Kriton Beyer, aka kriton b.
 Nuc Box Hums (2017, Creative Sources Recordings – CS 408 CD)
 Redox Reaction – Live at Petersburg Art Space, Berlin (2021, Confront Recordings, London)
 Uproot – morphemes (2022, Procrustean Bed Records, PBR011)
Samuel Burt
Daniel Fishkin
You're A Strong One
Michael Hearst (born 1972)
Michael Hearst Songs For Unusual Creatures (2012) (Urban Geek Records)
Richard van Hoesel
Hans Reichel (1949-2011)
The Dawn of Dachsman (1987, FMP)
Shanghaied on Tor Road: The World's 1st Operetta Performed on Nothing but the Daxophone (1992, FMP CD 46)
Lower Lurum (1993/1994, Rastascan BRD 016)
Yuxo: A New Daxophone Operetta (2002, A/L/L 003)
John C.L. Jansen
Music for Amplified Wood and Strings
Robert Schwimmer
Mark Stewart
Kazuhisa Uchihashi
King Pawns: Live in Berlin 2006 (with Hans Reichel, Innocentrecords ZEN-006)
Talking Daxophone (2018, Daxophone solo series, Innocentrecords icr-23)
Singing Daxophone (2021, Daxophone solo series 2, Innocentrecords icr-25)
Rei de Vries (born 1998)
Debut (Sound Lounge) (On Three D Radio, with Cellist Vladimir Dale)
Oneohtrix Point Never (real name Daniel Lopatin)
 Black Snow from Age Of (2018, Warp Records via Inertia Music) 
[bugs cry what(吉本裕美子Yumiko Yoshimoto + 狩俣道夫Michio Karimata ) jigen production2019

See also 
Musical saw

References

External links 

Hans Reichel's FMP releases
Reichel's step-by-step construction of a daxophone

Album by American daxophonist Daniel Fishkin, featuring some live-looped daxophone recordings
An extension of Reichel's design by Richard van Hoesel (with audio examples)

Individual friction plaques
Bowed instruments
Amplified instruments
Experimental musical instruments
Continuous pitch instruments